The Downtown Cumberland Historic District, also referred to as the Downtown Cumberland Mall, is the main shopping and dining district for the city of Cumberland, Maryland.

Location
The district is located in the heart of the downtown area along Baltimore Street, the formerly the main thoroughfare through the city. Baltimore Street is now a brick pedestrian mall. The street is lined with large multistory commercial buildings, most of which were built in the late 19th and early 20th centuries. These buildings, which were formerly banks, hotels, and department stores, are relics of the city's former wealth and importance during the industrial age. They now contain tourist oriented businesses such as sidewalk cafes, antique stores, boutiques and art galleries. Baltimore Street hosts some of the city's biggest sidewalk festivals and block parties. In the warmer months the weekly Farmers Market will draw hundreds downtown and often evenings there will be activities such as outdoor dining with live music or block parties.

Downtown buildings

See also
 Canal Place
 Country Club Mall
 Cumberland YMCA
 CSX Transportation

References

External links

 Downtown Cumberland
 Downtown Cumberland Business Association
, including photo from 2002, at Maryland Historical Trust

Buildings and structures in Cumberland, Maryland
Cumberland, Maryland
Downtown Cumberland, Maryland
Historic districts in Allegany County, Maryland
Historic districts on the National Register of Historic Places in Maryland
Places located in Cumberland, MD-WV-PA
Shopping malls in Maryland
National Register of Historic Places in Allegany County, Maryland